Sviatlana (Belarusian: Святлана) is a Belarusian female given name and may refer to:

Sviatlana Khakhlova (born 1984), a Belarusian swimmer
Sviatlana Kouhan (born 1980), a Belarusian long-distance runner
Sviatlana Kudzelich (born 1987), a Belarusian long-distance runner
Sviatlana Makshtarova (born 1994), a Belarusian-Azerbaijani individual and synchronised trampolinist
Sviatlana Pirazhenka (born 1992), a Belarusian tennis player
Sviatlana Sakhanenka (born 1989), a Belarusian Paralympic biathlete
Sviatlana Siarova (born 1986), a Belarusian discus thrower
Sviatlana Sudak Torun (born 1971), a Turkish hammer thrower of Belarusian origin
Sviatlana Volnaya (born 1979), a Belarusian basketball player
Sviatlana Vusovich (born 1980), a Belarusian sprinter
Sviatlana Tsikhanouskaya (born 1982), a Belarusian presidential candidate

See also
Svitlana (Ukrainian: Світлана), a Ukrainian female given name
Svetlana (Cyrillic: Светлана), a Slavic (Russian, ...) female given name

Belarusian feminine given names